Misled Youth is debut EP and release by the Christian rapper Manafest.  It was released independently on October 4, 2001.

Awards
The track "Freedom" from the release won "Modern Rock/Alternative Song of the Year" at the 24th annual GMA Canada Covenant Awards.

Track listing

Personnel
Manafest - lead vocals, executive producer
Adam Messinger - mixing
Nick Rawson - mastering
Gerhard Thomas (That Brotha Lokey) - co-executive producer
DeShaun "LINX" Jones - associate executive producer
Melanie Cardoza - photography
Shayne Ferguson - logo design
Pasi Posti - director (for "Session" music video clip)

Music videos

Notes
According to Chris Greenwood, "Session" was the first track he ever wrote as Manafest.
Besides this earliest known work, Manafest has released a 2000 demo song entitled "Mind Master" featuring Jusachyl.  It was made available on the iTunes deluxe edition of Manafest's 2005 album Epiphany.
The release is also referred to as Manafest the EP on the physical CD casing.
If one acquires a physical CD copy of the EP, the music video clip for "Session" is included on the disc.

References

2001 debut EPs
Manafest albums
Christian hip hop EPs